The 1998 Kazakhstan Top Division was the seventh season of the Top Division, now called the Kazakhstan Premier League, the highest football league competition in Kazakhstan.

Teams
Following the conclusion of the previous season, Aktobe and Ulytau were relegated, with Nasha Kampaniya and Naryn being promoted in their place. Prior to the start of the season, Kairat were replaced by CSKA Kairat and Avtomobilist were renamed Khimik following their move to Stepnogorsk.

Team overview

League table

Results

Statistics

Top scorers

See also
Kazakhstan national football team 1998

References

Kazakhstan Premier League seasons
1
Kazakh
Kazakh